WYMY ("La Ley 101.1" FM) is a Regional Mexican radio station in Burlington, North Carolina, United States. It serves the Triad and Triangle areas, which includes cities such as Greensboro, Winston-Salem, Raleigh and Durham. In addition the signal goes well north of Danville, Virginia. The outlet, which is owned by Curtis Media Group, claims to have the largest FM radio signal in all of North Carolina, operating with an ERP of 100 kW. The reason for that FM radio signal claim comes from Curtis Media, due to the population covered by the station's signal. The transmitter is located on Bass Mountain in the Cane Creek Mountains in Alamance County, and studios are in Burlington.

History
WBBB-FM signed on at 101.3 in 1946 as a sister station to WBBB in Burlington, North Carolina. After moving to 101.1, the station became easy listening WNCB. Starting in 1978, WPCM flipped to a  country music format as "Country 101".

During the 1990s, the station paired up with WKIX in Goldsboro, North Carolina, and targeted listeners in the Raleigh market. At one point, the call letters were changed to WKXU. For a time, this station played classic country. Later, WKXU switched to country music, calling itself Kix 101.1.

The station changed to a news/talk format under the WZTK call letters on July 6, 2004. The first live voices heard on "FM Talk 101.1" were those of Brad Krantz and Britt Whitmire, who remained with the station for the format's duration. WZTK's sister AM station WPCM (920 kilohertz), previously known as WBBB, simulcasted the FM's talk programming until summer 2005, when it went back to its beach/oldies format.

ABC News Radio broadcast on the hour 24/7. Listeners heard a variety of talk shows including Michael Savage, Alan Colmes, as well as financial advice from Clark Howard, and local/state issues. FM Talk 101.1 also offered smooth jazz weekends. WZTK was once an affiliate of Jones Radio Networks's Smooth Jazz satellite-delivered format until the format was discontinued on September 30, 2008. It continued to air on WZTK without announcers, with music provided by Jones Radio/Dial Global.

The station was also an affiliate of the Carolina Panthers Radio Network and carried Wake Forest University football & men's basketball.

On February 14, 2007, WZTK's parent company, Curtis Media Group, closed a purchase of WSJS, WMFR, and WSJS's simulcast partner WSML. This gave Curtis a monopoly on news/talk in the Triad (and for all practical purposes, in the Triangle, as well) until WPTI and WRDU switched to the format in January 2010. Both WMFR and WSML joined newly acquired WCOG to form Triad Sports Radio later that year.

On March 12, 2012, Curtis Media Group announced it would end the News/Talk format after 8 years. Brad and Britt, Neal Boortz, and Clark Howard all moved to WSJS and WPTK, while Alan Colmes, Michael Savage, and Allan Handelman were displaced entirely.

At Midnight on March 13, 2012, after the 2nd hour of The Alan Colmes Show, the station flipped to a simulcast of WWPL. This was a placeholder move as Curtis Media Group prepared a new format that they promise will have more community service and long-term profitability. WZTK launched its new format in Spanish on April 3 by simulcasting WYMY, this time as "La Ley 96.9 & 101.1 FM."

On January 3, 2013, WZTK's callsign was changed to WYMY when 96.9 FM became WBZJ and ended the simulcast. On March 11, 2014, the simulcast resumed, but six months later, it ended again after WYMY solved some weather-related signal problems.

References

External links

YMY
YMY
Radio stations established in 1946
1946 establishments in North Carolina
YMY